Mirnesa Bećirović and Mirneta Bećirović (born 1 November 1991) are twin Austrian martial artists of Bosnian origin who represent Austria in sport jujitsu in the pair discipline Duo System (Kata). 

The twins were born in Zvornik, in Bosnia, but when they were eight months old moved with their parents to Pressbaum in Austria because of the war in Bosnia. They began their martial arts training at the age of 6, and are members of the Jiu Jitsu Goshindo club in Pressbaum, where they have been trained by Robert Horak. The twins graduated together from education in law enforcement and  work in Mödling District.

They are undefeated in the highest level tournaments since 2012.

References

1991 births
Living people
Austrian martial artists
World Games gold medalists
Competitors at the 2013 World Games
Competitors at the 2017 World Games
Austrian police officers